Berdiansk or Berdyansk is a port city in Zaporizhzhia Oblast, south-eastern Ukraine. It is on the northern coast of the Sea of Azov, which is connected to the Black Sea. It serves as the administrative center of Berdiansk Raion, though it does not belong to the raion. The city is named after the Berda River's Berdianska Spit, at the foot of which it is located. Its population is 

Berdiansk is home to a safari zoo, water park, museums, health resorts with mud baths and climatic treatments, and numerous water sport activities.

Since 27 February 2022, Berdiansk has been under Russian military occupation.

Name
Its original name was "Kutur-Ogly". The city name changed to "Novo-Nogaisk" in 1830 ("New Nogaisk") (see Nogai). The present name was given to the city in 1841 by special decree of Nicholas I and named after the nearby Berda River.

Between 1939 and 1958 the city was known as "Osypenko", so named after Hero of the Soviet Union Polina Osipenko. This name has now been given to the nearby village Osypenko, where Polina Osipenko was born.

History

19th century
In the 19th century, the Russian Imperial government began to plan to build a seaport in the Northern Azov region. In 1824, Count Mikhail Vorontsov, Governor-General of the Caucasus Viceroyalty, sent an expedition to the Azov Sea. Its task was to find a place to build a new seaport to assist in the defense of Russia's southern borders. Initially, the place for a future port was implied in the village of Obetochnoe that belonged to Count Orlov-Denisov, near the town of Nogaisk founded in 1821.

In the autumn of 1824, Captain N. Kritsky, the expedition supervisor reported on several prospective sites; the best being a place closed off from the sea by the Berdianska Spit. In an official report to Vorontsov, Kritsky wrote: "the quality of Berdiansk Spit surpasses that of Obytichna Spit; you can build a landing stage and port on it unless you concede to Sevastopol...".

In 1820s, the place of the future Berdiansk was just a small settlement of fishers with a few huts In 1825, merchant Nikolay Kobozev built a private wooden quay which was opened with a ceremony on July 1, 1830. Only by 12 January 1835, a state-owned quay had been built.

In 1833, Kobozev set up a wooden post to function as a navigation beacon; a modern stone lighthouse was built under the leadership of the Italian merchant Carlo Tomasini in 1838. It is a  octahedral whitestone tower with an orange stripe in the middle. The beacon fires protected sailing ships and was first seen in 1840. Almost half a century later, in 1883, the oil lamps were replaced by electric lights. The old beacon was refurbished and upgraded with newer equipment. In 1836, the first foreign ship entered the port of Berdiansk.

In 1841 the settlement at Berdiansk Bay received city status. Grigory Chernyaev (1787—1868) was appointed the city governor (gradonachalnik) and the head of Berdiansk sea port. Chernyaev, an officer from landed gentry, took part in the Battle of Borodino. After the defeat of Napoleon he was appointed a comendant of Valenciennes. Mikhail Vorontsov knew him from France, when the former was the commander of the Russian expedition forces.

The son of the Nogaisk merchant who owned fisheries at Berdiansk Bay, Nikolay Kobozev, was elected the first mayor of the city in 1841. During his term, the small township turned into a flourishing city with a large number of foreign companies' offices and active international trade. He built the first stone houses in the town and the famous Winter Theater, destroyed during World War II.

In 1842, Berdiansk became the district center. On 31 January 1845, the first coat of arms of Berdiansk was created. At the top, on a green background, is a silver Nogai nomadic tent together with a black plow; this denotes the semi-nomadic life lived in the Nogais and farming work done by local residents. In the bottom part, on a blue background, sits a black anchor to symbolize the district's affinity with the sea. By this time the customs outpost was already opened. Some foreign marine grain purchasing representatives (negotiators) moved their offices to Berdiansk from Mariupol and Odesa.

20th century
During the Ukrainian War of Independence, Berdiansk fell under the control of the Makhnovshchina, becoming one of the key centres for the Ukrainian anarchist movement.

During the Soviet period Berdiansk was a powerful industrial centre. There were machine factories of all types, an oil refinery, a fiberglass factory, cable factory, ferroconcrete combine, factory of materials handling equipment, provisions factory, a bread-baking complex, milk plant, a meat-packing plant, a considerable quantity of construction and mounting organizations, commodity railway station and the sea trading port.

21st century

Following the completion of the Crimea Bridge, and amidst hostile Ukrainian-Russian relations, the Ukrainian seaport authority stated in November 2018 that in Berdiansk year on year shipping had dropped 50%. They said that this was due to ships not getting permission from Russia to pass through the Kerch strait. Russia denied any disruption to Ukrainian shipping.

On 27 February 2022, three days after the 2022 Russian invasion of Ukraine began, Berdiansk was captured by the Russian Army following the Battle of Berdiansk during the Southern Ukraine offensive of the 2022 Russian invasion of Ukraine. Many local people protested the occupation in the streets, singing the Ukrainian national anthem. The Russian navy Alligator-class landing ship Saratov was sunk in the port of Berdiansk by a Ukrainian attack on 24 March 2022.

On 6 September 2022 Artem Bardin, the city's Russian-imposed commandant, was attacked and seriously injured near the administration building, and died later that day.

A series of explosions was reported at Russian-occupied Berdiansk air base on 8 December 2022.

Berdiansk Airport is located nearby.

Development
The city developed and grew, though construction was random and haphazard. In the center, private residences for the nobility, merchants, priests were built, as well as office accommodation. Suburbs arose in the outskirts of Berdiansk, such as Sailor, German, Soldier (Liska), Dog beam Havrylivka, and Near and Far Majority.

In April 1862 Tsar Alexander II with assistance from Mayor N. Kobozev confirmed the city district plan for Berdiansk. In the plan, the streets were straight and led to the sea. This layout has remained to the present day in the central part of the city. It was forbidden to build houses above the second floor. Fine buildings decorate Berdiansk: the Winter Theatre, City Hall, the hotel "Bristol" (now House of Culture factory "Pivdenhidromash"), male classical school (now the main building of the Pedagogical Institute), Ascension Cathedral, the Lutheran Church, and more.

In Berdiansk the main employer was still the seaport, and on March 24, 1869, the breakwater was commissioned. The increasing importance of the port was mentioned in 1867 in a commemorative book on the Taurian province: "Already there is no doubt, that for all the Azov coast the Berdiansk port will be the Odessa of the Black Sea coast".

In 1876 as part of the defense of Sevastopol, rear admiral P. P. Schmidt was appointed Town Governor and Port Chief. Being a progressive man, he did much to promote the development of both port and city. Soon there were small industrial enterprises and banks opening in the city. John Greaves' factory manufacturing harvesters became well known across Europe. A farming machine factory was opened by Schröder and Matias. There was the rope-making factory of Venz and Yanzen, Selstrem's candle-wax works, Litsmen sausage factory, Fetter's brewery, Klavdin macaroni factory, and Ediger's printing house. The Italians constructed the city power station. By this time, two daily newspapers, three libraries and four bookshops were established. The city had running water and electric light illumination.

In 1899 Berdiansk was linked up to the railway. At the beginning of the 20th century the city population numbered 26,500. There were about ten orthodox temples, two Jewish and one Karaite synagogue, boys and girls grammar schools, nautical classes, a city college and some credit institutions. In addition to an extensive export trade in mainly grain and flour, Berdiansk conducted large amounts of inland trade. It became a substantial distributive market for goods received over a wide area. By the beginnings of the 20th century, Berdiansk had become a merchant trading port with well developed industry, strongly influenced by its infrastructure. In 1915 a French consul, and the vice-consuls of the UK, Greece, Denmark, Spain, Italy, Sweden, and Norway, were in Berdiansk.

Geography

Berdiansk is located in a steppe zone that defines its varieties of flora and fauna. The climate on the Azov coast is unique: the summers are hot and dry, the winters are mild and warm. The main natural feature is the end of the Berdianska spit. The spit flora is quite diverse. Here one can find more than 300 different kinds of plants. Some of them are documented in the Red Book (e.g. Carex colchica, Eryngium maritimum, Glycyrrhiza glabra). The vegetation is mostly made up of plants with powerful root systems.

In spite of the fact that the spit is a populous territory, it exhibits a wide variety of fauna. Here it is possible to see hares, hedgehogs, martens, foxes, weasels and steppe cats. There also are: geese, sandpipers, swans, herons, ducks, magpies, seagulls, cormorants, warblers, lapwings, red-breasted geese and mute swans. Their numbers swell during the migration season. The islands of Big Dzendzik and Small Dzendzik, small islands in the Astapih's archipelago, contain most of the birds.

Sea water temperatures off Berdiansk are higher than the Black Sea coast of the Crimea and the Caucasus. In the sea there are more than 70 fish species amongst them great sturgeon, Russian sturgeon, starred sturgeon, Azov turbot, haarder, mullets, kilka, anchovy, sea roach, shemaya and various species of gobies. There are predators too, pike perch and sterlet. The phytoplankton consists of diatomaceous, peridinium and cyanobacteria algae. At the bottom of the sea are large quantity of molluscs, such as cockles, sendesmiya, mussels and myas. They form an important food source for the fish. In coastal waters there are also dolphins.

Demographics

Note: Historical population record is taken out of Encyclopedia of Ukraine.

Culture
In the city of Berdiansk, there are several art museums, Schmidt's Museum, Museum of World War II and Berdiansk History Museum. It is a host city to more than ten festivals a year. The list includes:
the Azov Summer Ukrainian Journalism Festival 
the Brigantine Film Festival 
the Berdiansk Jazz Festival 
the Hilarious by the Dark Blue Sea Comedy Festival 
the Top-Top Children's Talent Festival 
the Starfall Children's Pop Music Festival 
Berdiansk Folk and Religious Music Festival 
the Heat of the Sun Festival 
the Azov Sails Televised Children's Talent Festival 
the Rock'n'roll Slavic Soul Festival, 
the Beer Festival

Monuments

Berdiansk has unusual monuments. Along with monuments to Alexander Pushkin and Pyotr Schmidt there are monuments to the goby-supporter, the sanitary technician, the boy-fisherman, an envious toad, and the children of lieutenant Schmidt. The armchair of desires is also popular. It is said if one sits down on it and thinks of a desire then it will come true. These unusual monuments are being restored on Azov avenue.

Tourism

The status of the city has gradually changed from an Industrial centre to more of a tourist centre. Today Berdiansk is the main resort city on the Azov coast. Its population numbers about 130,000, and during the resort season this figure rises to about 600 thousand. The leisure facilities are highly developed and successfully compete with resorts on the Black Sea Coast and the Crimea. There are a large number of sanatoriums and resorts where it is possible to take medical and restorative courses for "health improvement".

On the Berdianska spit there are about: 7 sanatoriums, 17 children's and sports establishments, 45 recreation centres and boarding houses that receive up to 15 thousand visitors. There is also the biggest Aquapark in Europe, the Kyiv dolphinarium, a safari zoo, and a lot of pleasure and cultural establishments. Gradually Berdiansk is evolving into a modern European city. In 2001 it received first place in an All-Ukrainian competition for best city beautification.

In the pedestrian area of Azov Avenue, the Seaside square and Berdiansk quays it is possible to travel on trishaws, a small steam locomotive and on real horses. On all beaches there are entertainments such as: riding on rubber bananas and tablets, water bicycles and motorcycles, slides and trampolines, and sailing. There is also nightlife, with many bars and restaurants located directly on the sea coast.

Economy

One of the main enterprises is the sea trading port, with clients from all over the world. It carries out metal processing, scrap metal, grain, coal, ore, clay, sunflower-seed oil, industrial oils, mineral oil, and pig-iron. There is a complex for processing fertilizers and mineral oil, the container terminal, and a railway depot. Tracks and roads approach all moorings, and all are equipped with electric cranes.

Berdiansk is also an important fisheries centre which is an integral part of the city's food industry. There is also a scientific organisation which does fish research in reservoirs of the Azov basin. It determines stock levels and calculates the annual volumes of withdrawal of such valuable food fish as sturgeon, pike perch, haarder, Azov turbot, Azov gobies, and flounder.

Industry
During the Soviet period Berdiansk was a powerful industrial centre. There were machine factories of all types, an oil refinery, a fiberglass factory, cable factory, ferroconcrete combine, factory of materials handling equipment, provisions factory, a bread-baking complex, milk plant, a meat-packing plant, a considerable quantity of construction and mounting organizations, commodity railway station and the sea trading port. However, in the early independence years the majority of the large industrial enterprises ceased or were reorganised into smaller private concerns.

Chemical and the petroleum-refining industry is represented by two big enterprises: "AZMOL," and the Berdiansk state fiberglass factory, plus two small enterprises: Limited Liability Company "Fibreglass" and Closed Corporation "Bertie."
Public corporation "AZMOL" is engaged in the manufacture of lubricants and packaging, and the development of new products using energy-efficient technologies. Transfer to municipal ownership of the city biological sewage treatment plant is planned.

Education

As well as the state comprehensive schools there are private lyceums and gymnasiums, as well as branches of other high schools and professional colleges. There is the Berdiansk State Pedagogical University and the University of Management and Business. In the Schmidt park there is the Berdiansk musical school, and nearby, almost on the coast, an art school. A subject of pride in Berdiansk is the Centre of Children's and Youthful Creativity, numbering a large quantity of study groups and ensembles.

According to Ben Eklof in Russian Peasant Schools, education in Berdiansk was badly disrupted in the 1870s when the schools director, a government inspector, 'ran amok' and had to be removed from his post.

Notable people
Peter Jansen (1852–1923), born in Berdiansk, rancher and founder of Jansen, Nebraska, State Representative and Senator
Opanas Slastion (1855–1933), painter
Waldemar Haffkine (1860–1930), bacteriologist
Joel Engel (1868—1927), music critic and composer
Sergei Spytetsky (1877—1963) Orthodox (and later Greek-Catholic) priest
Isaak Brodsky (1883–1939), Soviet-Jewish painter
Polina Osipenko (1907–1939), Soviet military pilot, was born in a nearby village of Osypenko
Mikhail Voskresensky (born 1935), Russian pianist
Tatyana Prorochenko (1952–2020), athlete, Olympic champion (in 1976 and 1980)
Olga Kurylenko (born 1979), model and actor
Vladyslav Buialskyi (born 1997), opera singer

Twin towns – sister cities

Berdiansk is twinned with:

 Beibei (Chongqing), China
 Bielsko-Biała, Poland
 Glyfada, Greece
 Haisyn, Ukraine
 Horodenka, Ukraine
 Khmilnyk, Ukraine
 Kremenchuk, Ukraine
 Lowell, United States
 Poti, Georgia
 La Seyne-sur-Mer, France
 Yambol, Bulgaria

References

External links

Berdiansk-City – site of the city of Berdiansk

 
Cities in Zaporizhzhia Oblast
Berdyansky Uyezd
Port cities and towns in Ukraine
Seaside resorts in Ukraine
Spa towns in Ukraine
Populated places established in 1673
Port cities and towns of the Azov Sea
Cities of regional significance in Ukraine
Populated places established in the Russian Empire
1827 establishments in the Russian Empire